Mijnsheerenland is a village and a former municipality on the Hoeksche Waard island in the Dutch province of South Holland with 4,435 inhabitants (as of 1 January 2006). It is located on the shores of the Binnenbedijkte Maas (Lake Binnenmaas), about 14 km south of the city of Rotterdam, in the municipality of Hoeksche Waard. It was the only village in the former municipality Binnenmaas not built next to a dyke.

The main street of Mijnsheerenland is the Raadhuislaan. This street used to be dominated by farmhouses, but in recent years many of them were demolished and replaced by modern homes as Mijnsheerenland became preferred by upmarket house buyers.

History 
After the St. Elizabeth's flood the former land of Schobbe en Everocken was re-dyked in 1437-1438 by the knight Lodewijk Praet of Moerkerken; therefore, the village is often called Mijnsheerenland van Moerkerken. The name of the village (meaning My Lord's Land in English) doesn't have a religious background but states the factual situation of the land belonging to its Lord, Praet of Moerkerken.

Sights

Hof van Moerkerken
Next to the centre of the village lies the Hof van Moerkerken, a medieval buitenplaats on which an 18th-century mansion is located. The Hof van Moerkerken was where the Lord of the Manor lived.

The Dutch writer Frederik van Eeden lived on the Hof van Moerkerken in the 19th century. His famous novel Van de koele meren des doods was written there, and it was the filming location for the 1982 Dutch movie based on the novel. The Hof is privately owned and therefore not accessible to the public; its garden, however, is open to the public on Open Monument Day.

Laurentius Church
The Laurentius Church is a gothic church built in 1445, and is located in the middle of the village. The gothic architectural style is unusual for the Hoeksche Waard.

Windmills
There are two windmills in the village area: the grist mill De Goede Hoop (somewhat hidden within the village), and the post mill Oostmolen outside the core village of Mijnsheerenland. The latter is a drainage mill, and was used until 1948 for draining water from the Moerkerken polder.

Lake Binnenmaas
Lake Binnenmaas is a lake to the south of Mijnsheerenland, providing a small beach and a yachting club located near the village.

Notable people

Emely de Heus, motor racing driver
Nijs Korevaar, water polo player
Wietske van Leeuwen, ceramist
Patrick van Luijk, sprinter
Lennart Stekelenburg, swimmer

Gallery

References

External links

 List of Rijksmonumenten in Mijnsheerenland. 

Populated places in South Holland
Former municipalities of South Holland
Hoeksche Waard